Ackroyd is an English surname. Notable people with the surname include:

 Alan Ackroyd (born 1948), English rugby league footballer
 Albert Akroyd, English rugby league player
 Alfred Ackroyd (1858–1927), English cricketer
 Anthony Ackroyd (born 1958), Australian comedian, speaker and writer
 Archibald Ackroyd (1897–1968), English cricketer
 Barry Ackroyd (born 1954), English cinematographer
 Christa Ackroyd (born 1957), British journalist and broadcaster
 Sir Cuthbert Ackroyd, 1st Baronet (1892–1973), Lord Mayor of London 1955–56
 David Ackroyd (born 1940), American actor
 Harold Ackroyd (1877–1917), British Army medical officer, awarded the Victoria Cross
 Haughton Ackroyd (1894–1979), English footballer
 Heather Ackroyd, British visual artist, of Ackroyd & Harvey
 Jack Ackroyd (1926–1992), Canadian chief of police and civil servant
 Jane Ackroyd (born 1957), English sculptor
 Jenny Ackroyd (1950–2004), English vascular surgeon
 John Ackroyd (disambiguation), various people
 Joseph Ackroyd (1847–1915), New York politician
 Joyce Ackroyd (1918–1991), Australian academic, translator, author and editor
 Norman Ackroyd (born 1938), English artist
 Peter Ackroyd (born 1949), English biographer, novelist and critic
 Peter Ackroyd (biblical scholar) (1917–2005), British Old Testament scholar
 Poppy Ackroyd (born 1982), British composer, pianist and violinist 
 Thomas Raven Ackroyd (1861–1946), English bank manager and politician
 Timothy Ackroyd (born 1958), English actor

See also 
 The Murder of Roger Ackroyd, 1926 novel by Agatha Christie
 The Mrs Ackroyd Band, a band in Manchester, England
 Aykroyd
 Akroyd

References 

English-language surnames